Spokil is a constructed language created by the Frenchman Adolphe Nicolas.

During the 1880s, the most popular international auxiliary language was undeniably Volapük. However, after a brief period of overwhelming success, rivalry on the part of the more practical and less complicated Esperanto (published in 1887) led to a rapid decline of the Volapük movement. Many who had previously supported Volapük switched to the Esperanto camp, while others tried their best to improve or reform Volapük itself. Partially due to the inflexible attitude of Johann Martin Schleyer, the creator of Volapük, himself, this led to several schisms in the Volapük movement. As a result, a number of so-called "Volapükids" emerged, most notably Idiom Neutral, first published in 1902, and Spokil.

Spokil was created by Adolphe Charles Antoine Marie Nicolas (1833-?), a French ship's doctor from La Bourboule. A former partisan of Volapük, he started working on Spokil in 1890 (though some sources mention 1887 instead). In 1904, he published a book about it: Spokil. Language internationale. Grammaire, exercise, les deux dictionnaires. At a conference in Paris, held in June 1907, Nicolas was allowed to defend his language in person; among the other languages discussed at the conference were Parla, Bolak (La Langue Bleue), Idiom Neutral, and Esperanto. At the same meeting, Ido was first presented. Spokil never gained much support, however, and nowadays is largely forgotten.

Like Volapük, Spokil is most often qualified as an a priori/a posteriori hybrid. Some authors, including Nicolas himself, consider it a purely a priori language.

Phonology

Consonants

Vowels

Text samples

The Lord's Prayer:
Mael nio, kui vai o les zeal;
Aepseno lezai tio mita.
Veze lezai tio tsaeleda.
Feleno lezai tio bela,
uti o zeal itu o geol.
Demai da ni itu ebilai da gelenelas nio.
E no apidai ni o fismena.
Stu nibai ni le sfail.

Amen.

The numbers 1-10:
ba, ge, di, vo, mu, fa, te, ki, po, nu.

References

Further reading
 Nicolas, Adolphe Charles Antoine Marie, Spokil. Langue internationale. Grammaire, exercises, les deux dictionnaires. Paris: Maloine, 1904 (272+ p.)

External links

 A website about Spokil

International auxiliary languages
Constructed languages introduced in the 1880s
1887 introductions
Constructed languages